Edgar Henry Brown, Jr. (December 27, 1926 – December 22, 2021) was an American mathematician specializing in algebraic topology, and for many years a professor at Brandeis University.

Life
Brown was born in Oak Park, Illinois.  He completed his bachelor's degree in mathematics at the University of Wisconsin in 1949. He completed his master's degree in mathematics at Washington State University in 1951.

Career
He completed his Ph.D. in mathematics at the Massachusetts Institute of Technology in 1954. His doctoral supervisor was George W. Whitehead, and his doctoral dissertation was on Finite Computability of the Homotopy Groups of Finite Groups.

In 1962–63 he visited the Institute for Advanced Study in Princeton, New Jersey, and in 1964 he received the Guggenheim Fellowship. He was elected a Fellow of the American Academy of Arts and Sciences in 1974 and a Fellow of the American Mathematical Society in 2012.

Contributions to mathematics
He made numerous contributions to mathematics including:

 Brown's representability theorem
 Brown–Peterson cohomology
 Brown–Gitler spectrum

His publications include:

References

1926 births
2021 deaths
Mathematicians from Illinois
People from Oak Park, Illinois
Washington State University alumni
University of Wisconsin–Madison College of Letters and Science alumni
Massachusetts Institute of Technology School of Science alumni
20th-century American mathematicians
21st-century American mathematicians
Topologists
Brandeis University faculty
Institute for Advanced Study people
Fellows of the American Academy of Arts and Sciences
Fellows of the American Mathematical Society